Exeter City Council is the council and local government of the city of Exeter, Devon.

History

Proposed unitary authority status

The government proposed that the city should become an independent unitary authority within Devon, much like neighbouring Plymouth and Torbay.  The statutory orders to set up the unitary authority were passed in Parliament and a new unitary city council was due to start in Exeter on 1 April 2011. However, following the 2010 general election the new government announced in May 2010 that the reorganisation would be blocked.

Boundaries

The Local Government Boundary Commission for England published its final recommendations in September 2015 for changes to the wards in Exeter. The aim was to reduce the city's high levels in electoral inequality. The number of wards was reduced to 13; each electing three councillors for a total of 39. Following parliamentary approval, it came into effect at the 2016 election.

Wards and councillors

The wards of the city for City Council purposes are listed below.

Alphington
Duryard & St James
Exwick
Heavitree
Mincinglake & Whipton
Newtown & St Leonards
Pennsylvania
Pinhoe
Priory
St David's
St Loyes
St Thomas
Topsham

All city wards return three councillors to the Council. The council holds elections by thirds over a four-year cycle – one third of seats being contested in each of three years, and elections to Devon County Council taking place in the fourth.

As of May 2022, the current political control of the council is as follows:

The Green Party, Liberal Democrats and one Independent (Jemima Moore, Newtown and St Leonard's) sit as a single Progressive Group on the Council, and they are currently the largest Opposition group, with Diana Moore (Green, St David's) and Kevin Mitchell (Liberal Democrat, Duryard and St James) acting as co-leaders of the group. 

Following the May 2022 elections, David Harvey (Pinhoe) left the Labour group, and subsequently sits as an Independent.

Premises

The council's main offices are at the Civic Centre, a 1970s building on Paris Street in the city centre. Full council meetings are generally held at the city's Guildhall at 203 High Street, which was built around 1470.

Summary results of elections
''See Exeter City Council elections for historic political composition and leadership of the council.

References

External links
Exeter City Council

Exeter
Non-metropolitan district councils of England
Billing authorities in England
Local authorities in Devon